Treat Her Right may refer to:

Treat Her Right, an American blues band
"Treat Her Right" (Roy Head song)
"Treat Her Right" (Sawyer Brown song)